The Open Championship, often referred to as The Open or the British Open, is the oldest golf tournament in the world, and one of the most prestigious. Founded in 1860, it was originally held annually at Prestwick Golf Club in Scotland. Later the venue rotated between a select group of coastal links golf courses in the United Kingdom. It is organised by the R&A.

The Open is one of the four men's major golf tournaments, the others being the Masters Tournament, the PGA Championship and the U.S. Open. Since the PGA Championship moved to May in 2019, the Open has been chronologically the fourth and final major tournament of the year. It is held in mid-July.

It is called The Open because it is in theory "open" to all, i.e. professional and amateur golfers. In practice, the current event is a professional tournament in which a small number of the world's leading amateurs also play, by invitation or qualification. The success of the tournament has led to many other open golf tournaments to be introduced around the world.

The reigning champion is Cameron Smith, who won the 2022 Open at St Andrews with a score of 268.

History

Early tournament years (1860–1870)

The first Open Championship was played on 17 October 1860 at Prestwick Golf Club in Ayrshire, Scotland, over three rounds of the twelve-hole links course. In the mid-19th century golf was played mainly by well-off gentlemen, as hand-crafted clubs and balls were expensive. Professionals made a living from playing for bets, caddying, ball and club making, and instruction. Allan Robertson was the most famous of these pros, and was regarded as the undisputed best golfer between 1843 and his death in 1859. James Ogilvie Fairlie of Prestwick Golf Club decided to form a competition in 1860, "to be played for by professional golfers", and to decide who would succeed Robertson as the "Champion Golfer". Blackheath (England), Perth, Bruntsfield (Edinburgh), Musselburgh and St Andrews golf clubs were invited to send up to three of their best players known as a "respectable caddie" to represent each of the clubs. The winner received the Challenge Belt, made from red leather with a silver buckle and worth £25, which came about thanks to being donated by the Earl of Eglinton, a man with a keen interest in medieval pageantry (belts were the type of trophy that might have been competed for in archery or jousting).

The first rule of the new golf competition was "The party winning the belt shall always leave the belt with the treasurer of the club until he produces a guarantee to the satisfaction of the above committee that the belt shall be safely kept and laid on the table at the next meeting to compete for it until it becomes the property of the winner by being won three times in succession". Eight golfers contested the event, with Willie Park, Sr. winning the championship by 2 shots from Old Tom Morris, and he was declared "The Champion Golfer of the Year".

A year later, it became "open" to amateurs as well as professionals. Ten professionals and eight amateurs contested the event, with Old Tom Morris winning the championship by 4 shots from Willie Park, Sr. A prize fund (£10) was introduced in 1863 split between 2nd, 3rd and 4th (the winner only received the Challenge Belt). From 1864 onwards a cash prize was also paid to the winner. Before this the only financial incentive was scheduling Prestwick's own domestic tournament the same week, this allowed professionals to earn a few days' work caddying for the wealthier gentlemen. Willie Park, Sr. went on to win two more tournaments, and Old Tom Morris three more, before Young Tom Morris won three consecutive titles between 1868 and 1870. The rules stated that he was allowed to keep the belt for achieving this feat. Because no trophy was available, the tournament was not held in 1871.

The introduction of course rotation and the Claret Jug (1872–1889)
On 11 September 1872 agreement was reached between Prestwick, the Honourable Company of Edinburgh Golfers and The Royal and Ancient Golf Club. They decided that each of the three clubs would contribute £10 towards the cost of a new trophy, which was to be a silver claret jug, known officially as The Golf Champion Trophy, and hosting of the Open would be rotated between the three clubs. These decisions were taken too late for the trophy to be presented to the 1872 Open champion, who was once again Young Tom Morris. Instead, he was awarded with a medal inscribed 'The Golf Champion Trophy', although he is the first to be engraved on the Claret Jug as the 1872 winner. Medals have been given to, and kept by the winner ever since. Young Tom Morris died in 1875, aged 24.

The tournament continued to be dominated and won by Scottish professionals, to be rotated between the three Scottish golf courses, and played over 36 holes in a single day until 1889.

English hosts and winners, and the Great Triumvirate (1890–1914)
In the 1890s, the tournament was won four times by three Englishman (two of whom were amateurs). In 1892 the tournament was played for the first time at the newly built Muirfield, which replaced Musselburgh as the host venue used by the Honourable Company of Edinburgh Golfers. A few years later St George's and Royal Liverpool in England were added to the rotation. From 1892 the tournament was increased in duration to four 18-hole rounds over two days (Prestwick had been extended to an 18-hole course by then).

Between 1898 and 1925 the tournament either had a cut after 36 holes, or a qualifying event, and the largest field was 226 in 1911. The large field meant sometimes the tournament was spread across up to four days. In 1907 Arnaud Massy from France became the first non-British winner. Royal Cinque Ports in England became the 6th different Open host course in 1909.

The pre-war period is most famous for the Great Triumvirate of Harry Vardon (Jersey), John Henry Taylor (England), and James Braid (Scotland). The trio combined to win The Open Championship 16 times in the 21 tournaments held between 1894 and 1914; Vardon won six times (a record that still stands today) with Braid and Taylor winning five apiece. In the five tournaments in this span the Triumvirate did not win, one or more of them finished runner-up. These rivalries enormously increased the public's interest in golf, but the first world war meant another Open was not held until 1920, and none of the trio won another Open.

American success with Walter Hagen and Bobby Jones, and the last Open at Prestwick (1920–1939)
In 1920 the Open returned, and The Royal and Ancient Golf Club became the sole organiser of the Open Championship. In 1926 they standardised the format of the tournament to spread over three days (18 holes on day 1 and 2, and 36 on day 3), and include both qualifying and a cut.

In 1921 eleven U.S.-based players travelled to Scotland financed by a popular subscription called the "British Open Championship Fund", after a campaign by the American magazine Golf Illustrated. Five of these players were actually British born, and had emigrated to America to take advantage of the high demand for club professionals as the popularity of golf grew. A match was played between the Americans and a team of British professionals, which is seen as a forerunner of the Ryder Cup. When the Open was held two weeks later, one of these visitors, Jock Hutchison, a naturalised American citizen, won in St Andrews, the town of his birth.

In 1922 Walter Hagen won the first of his four Opens, and become the first American-born winner. The period between 1923 and 1933 saw an American-based player win every year (two were British-born), and included three wins by amateur Bobby Jones, and one by Gene Sarazen, who had already won top tournaments in the United States. English players won every year between 1934 and 1939, including two wins by Henry Cotton (he would go on to win a third in 1948).

After overcrowding issues at the 1925 Open at Prestwick, it was decided it was no longer suitable for the growing size of the event, being too short, having too many blind shots, and it could not cope with the volume of spectators. The Open's original venue was replaced on the rota with Carnoustie, which hosted for the first time in 1931. Troon hosted for the first time in 1923, and Royal Lytham & St Annes was also added, hosting for the first time in 1926. Prince's hosted its one and only Open in 1932.

Bobby Locke, Peter Thomson, and Ben Hogan's Triple Crown (1946–1958)
The Open returned after the war to St Andrews, with a victory for American Sam Snead. Bobby Locke became the first South African winner, winning three times in four years between 1949 and 1952, and later winning a fourth title in 1957. Having already won the Masters and the U.S. Open earlier in the year, Ben Hogan won in his one and only Open appearance in 1953 to win the "Triple Crown". His achievement was so well regarded he returned to New York City to a ticker-tape parade. Peter Thomson became the first Australian winner, winning four times in five years between 1954 and 1958, and later winning a fifth title in 1965. After flooding prevented Royal Cinque Ports from hosting, both in 1938 and 1949, it was removed from the rota. The Open was played outside of England and Scotland for the first time in 1951 at Royal Portrush, Northern Ireland.

The period saw fewer American entrants, as the PGA Tour had grown to be quite lucrative, and the PGA Championship was often played at the same or similar time paying triple the prize money. A larger golf ball was also used in America, which meant they had to adjust for the Open.

Player, Palmer, Nicklaus – The Big Three (1959–1974)
In 1959, Gary Player, a young South African, won the first of his three Opens. Only four Americans had entered, but in 1960 Arnold Palmer travelled to Scotland after winning the Masters and U.S. Open, in an attempt to emulate Hogan's 1953 feat of winning all three tournaments in a single year. Although he finished second to Kel Nagle, he returned and won the Open in 1961 and 1962. Palmer was hugely popular in America, and his victories are likely to have been the first time many Americans would have seen the Open on television. This, along with the growth of trans-Atlantic jet travel, inspired many more Americans to travel in the future.

The period is primarily defined by the competition between Player, Palmer, and Jack Nicklaus. Nicklaus won three times (1966, 1970, 1978) and had a record seven runner-ups. American Lee Trevino also made his mark winning his two Opens back to back in 1971 and 1972, the latter denying Nicklaus a calendar year Grand Slam. The only British champion in this period was Tony Jacklin, and it is also notable for having the first winner from Argentina, Roberto De Vicenzo.

Watson, Ballesteros, Faldo, and Norman (1975–1993)
By 1975, the concept of the modern majors had been firmly established, and the PGA Championship had been moved to August since 1969, so no longer clashed with the Open. This meant the Open had a feel similar to the current tournament, with the leaders after 36 holes going off last (1957 onwards), all players having to use the "bigger ball" (1974 onwards), play spread over four days (1966 onwards, although the days were Wednesday to Saturday until 1980), and a field containing all the world's best players.

American Tom Watson won in 1975. Turnberry hosted for the first time in 1977, and Watson won the Open for the second time, after one of the most celebrated contests in golf history, when his duel with Jack Nicklaus went to the final shot before Watson emerged as the champion. He would go on to win again in 1980, 1982 and 1983, to win 5 times overall, a record only bettered by Harry Vardon, and he became regarded as one of the greatest links golf players of all time.

In 1976, 19-year-old Spaniard Seve Ballesteros gained attention in the golfing world when he finished second. He would go on to win three Opens (1979, 1984, 1988), and was the first continental European to win since Arnaud Massy in 1907. Other multiple winners in this period were Englishman Nick Faldo with three (1987, 1990, 1992), and Australian Greg Norman with two (1986, 1993).

Tiger Woods and the modern era (1994 onwards)
Every year between 1994 and 2004 had a first-time winner. In 1999, the Open at Carnoustie was famously difficult, and Frenchman Jean van de Velde had a three-shot lead teeing off on the final hole. He ended up triple bogeying after finding the Barry Burn, and Scotman Paul Lawrie, ranked 241st in the world, ended up winning in a playoff. He was 10 strokes behind the leader going into the final round, a record for all majors. He was not the only unheralded champion during this span, as 396th-ranked Ben Curtis and 56th-ranked Todd Hamilton won in 2003 and 2004, respectively.

In 2000, Tiger Woods, having just won the U.S. Open, became champion by a post-war record 8 strokes to become the youngest player to win the career Grand Slam at age 24. After winning the 2002 Masters and U.S. Open, he became the latest American to try to emulate Ben Hogan and win the Open in the same year. His bid came to a halt on Saturday with the worst round of his career up to that time, an 81 (+10) in cold, gusty rain. He went on to win again back-to-back in 2005 and 2006 to bring his total to three wins. Other multiple winners in this era are South African Ernie Els (2002, 2012) and Irishman Pádraig Harrington (2007, 2008).

In 2009, 59-year-old Tom Watson led the tournament through 71 holes and needed just a par on the last hole to become the oldest ever winner of a major championship, and also match Harry Vardon's six Opens. Watson bogeyed, setting up a four-hole playoff, which he lost to Stewart Cink. In 2015, Jordan Spieth became another American to arrive having already won the year's Masters and U.S. Open tournaments. He finished tied for fourth as Zach Johnson became champion. Spieth would go on to win the 2017 Open at Royal Birkdale.

American Phil Mickelson won his first Open, and fifth major, in 2013. In 2016, he was involved in an epic duel with Sweden's Henrik Stenson, which many people compared to the 1977 Duel in the Sun between Jack Nicklaus and Tom Watson. Stenson emerged the winner, and the first Scandinavian winner of a male professional major championship, with a record Open (and major) score of 264 (−20), three shots ahead of Mickelson, and 14 shots ahead of third place. Jack Nicklaus shared his thoughts on the final round, saying: "Phil Mickelson played one of the best rounds I have ever seen played in the Open and Henrik Stenson just played better—he played one of the greatest rounds I have ever seen".

Francesco Molinari won the 2018 Open at Carnoustie by two shots, to become the first Italian major winner. Shane Lowry won the 2019 Open when the tournament returned to Royal Portrush Golf Club, to become the second champion from the Republic of Ireland.

In 2020, the Open Championship was cancelled because of the COVID-19 pandemic. It was the first time the championship had been cancelled since World War II. The R&A also confirmed that Royal St George's, which would have hosted the championship in 2020, would be the host venue in 2021, effectively retaining the Old Course at St Andrews as the venue for the 150th Open.

Traditions

Links golf course
The Open is always played on a coastal links golf course. Links golf is often described as the "purest" form of golf and keeps a connection with the way the game originated in Scotland in the 15th century. The terrain is open, often without any trees, and will generally be undulating with a sandy base. The golf courses are often primarily shaped by nature, rather than 'built'. Weather, particularly wind, plays an important role, and although there will be a prevailing onshore breeze, changes in the wind direction and strength over the course of the tournament can mean each round of golf has to be played slightly differently. The courses are also famous for deep pot bunkers, and gorse bushes that make up the "rough". A golfer playing on a links course will often adapt his game so the flight of the ball is lower and so is less impacted by the wind, but this will make distance control more difficult. Also due to the windy conditions the speed of the greens are often slower than a golfer might be used to on the PGA Tour, to avoid the ball being moved by a gust.

Old Course at St Andrews
The Old Course at St Andrews is regarded as the oldest golf course in the world, and winning the Open there is often regarded as one of the pinnacles of golf. Given the special status of the Old Course, the Open is generally played there once every five years in the modern era, much more frequently than the other courses used for the Open. Previous champions will often choose St Andrews as their final Open tournament. It has become traditional to come down the 18th fairway to huge applause from the amphitheatre crowds, and to pose for final pictures on the Swilken Bridge with the picturesque clubhouse and town in the background.

Trophy presentation 
The Open trophy is the Claret Jug, which has been presented to the champion since 1873. The original trophy permanently resides on display in the R&A's Clubhouse at St Andrews. Therefore, the trophy that is presented at each Open is a replica which is retained by the winner for a year. It used to be the responsibility of the winner to get his name engraved on the trophy, but 1967 winner Roberto De Vicenzo returned the trophy without having done so. Subsequently, the winner's name is already engraved on it when presented, which often results in television commentators speculating as to when it is safe for the engraver to start. The winner of the Open is announced as "The Champion Golfer of the Year", a title which has been used since the first Open in 1860. He will nearly always pose for photos with the trophy sitting on one of the distinctive pot bunkers.

Name
The first event was held as an invitational tournament, but the next year Prestwick Golf Club declared that "the belt... on all future occasions, shall be open to all the world". In its early years it was often referred to as The Championship but with the advent of the Amateur Championship in 1885, it became more common to refer to it as The Open Championship or simply The Open. The tournament inspired other national bodies to introduce open golf tournaments of their own, such as the U.S. Open, and later many others. To distinguish it from their own national open, it became common in many countries to refer to the tournament as the "British Open". The R&A (the tournament's organiser) continued to refer to it as The Open Championship. During the interwar years, a period with many U.S.-based winners, the term British Open would occasionally be used during the trophy presentation and in British newspapers.

In 2017, a representative of the R&A openly stated that it is a priority to "eradicate the term British Open" and have a single identity and brand of "The Open" in all countries. Tournament partners, such as the PGA Tour, now refer to it without "British" in the title, media rightsholders are contractually required to refer to the event as The Open Championship, and the official website has released a statement titled "Why it's called 'The Open' and not the 'British Open'" stating that "The Open is the correct name for the Championship. It is also the most appropriate". The R&A's stance has attracted criticism from some commentators.

The R&A also run The Senior Open, the over 50s equivalent of the Open, which was officially known as the "Senior British Open" from its inception in 1987 until 2007, when "British" was dropped from the name. The Women's Open, seen by some as the women's equivalent to the Open (although unlike the Open it is not always held on a links course, and was not run by the R&A until 2017) was officially known as the "Women's British Open" from its inception in 1976 until 2020, when the word "British" was dropped from the name as part of a sponsorship deal with AIG.

Status 
The Open is recognised as one of the four major championships in golf, and is an official event on the PGA Tour, European Tour, and the Japan Golf Tour.

The Open began in 1860, and for many years it was not the most-followed event in golf, as challenge matches between top golfers were more keenly followed and drew larger crowds. The Great Triumvirate dominated the Open between 1894 and 1914 and were primarily responsible for the formation of the PGA in 1901 which had a big impact in promoting interest in professional golf (and therefore The Open) and increasing playing standards. Between the World Wars, the first wins by Americans were widely celebrated when they broke the dominance previously held by British players. After World War II, although the profile of the tournament remained high in the UK and Commonwealth countries, the low prize money compared to the US events and the cost of travel meant fewer Americans participated. High-profile visits and wins by Ben Hogan and Arnold Palmer, the growth of cheaper and faster transatlantic flights, and the introduction of television coverage recovered its prestige.

When the modern concept of the majors was cemented, the Open was included as one of those four. Thus, the Open is now one of the four majors in golf, along with the U.S. Open, PGA Championship, and Masters Tournament. The term "major" is a universally-acknowledged unofficial term used by players, the media, and golf followers to define the most important tournaments, and performance in them is often used to define the careers of the best golfers. There is often discussion amongst the golfing community as to whether the Open, U.S. Open, or the Masters Tournament is the most prestigious major, but opinion varies (often linked to nationality). The PGA Championship is usually seen as the least prestigious of the four.

In terms of official recognition, the tournament has been an event on the European Tour since its formation in 1972. In 1995, prize money won in the Open was included in the PGA Tour official money list for the first time, a change that caused an increase in the number of American entries. In addition all previous PGA Tour seasons have been retroactively adjusted to include the Open in official money and win statistics. Currently the Open, along with the other three majors and The Players Championship, are the top-tier tournaments in the FedEx cup, offering more points than any other non-playoff event. The Open is also an official event on the Japan Golf Tour.

Structure

Qualifying

Qualifying was introduced in 1907, and for much of its history, all players had to go through the qualification process. In the modern era, the majority of players get an exemption from qualification which is awarded for previous performance in the Open, performance in high-profile global tournaments (such as other majors), performance in top golf tours, or a high position in the Official World Golf Ranking (OWGR). Five amateurs are also exempt from qualifying by winning various global amateur titles provided they maintain their amateur status prior to The Open.

Another way of qualifying is to finish in a high position in the Open Qualifying Series of global events, which are about twelve tour events across the globe, run by various local golfing organisations.

Any male professional golfer, male amateur golfer whose playing handicap does not exceed 0.4 (i.e. scratch) or has been within World Amateur Golf Ranking listing 1–2,000 during the current calendar year, and any female golfer who finished in the top 5 and ties in the latest edition of any of the five women's majors is eligible to enter local qualifying. If they perform well they will go on to Final Qualifying, which is four simultaneous 36-hole one-day events held across the UK, with 12 players qualifying for the Open. If there are any spots left, then alternates are made up from the highest ranked players in the OWGR who are not already qualified, which brings the total field up to 156 players.

In 2018, the OWGR gave the Open a strength of field rating of 902 (the maximum possible is 1000 if the top 200 players in the world were all in a tournament). This was only bettered by the PGA Championship, a tournament which actively targets a high strength of field rating.

Format

Field: 156 players

Basic Format: 72 hole stroke play. Play 18 holes a day over four days, weather permitting.

Date of Tournament: Starts on the day before the third Friday in July.

Tournament Days: Thursday to Sunday.

Tee off times: Each player has one morning and one afternoon tee time in first two days in groups of three, which are mostly randomised (with some organiser discretion). Groupings of two on the last two days with last place going off first and leaders going out last.

Cut: After 36 holes, only top 70 and ties play the final 36 holes.

Playoff: If there is a tie for the lead after 72 holes, a three-hole aggregate playoff is held; followed by sudden death if the lead is still tied.

Prizes
Up until 2016, the purse was always stated, and paid, in pounds sterling (£), but was changed in 2017 to US dollars ($) in recognition of the fact that it is the most widely adopted currency for prize money in golf.

Champion's prizes and benefits

The champion receives trophies, the winner's prize money, and several exemptions from world golf tours and tournaments. He is also likely to receive a winner's bonus from his sponsors. The prizes and privileges on offer for the champion included:

 The Golf Champion Trophy (commonly known as the Claret Jug). The winner keeps the trophy until the next Open, at which point it must be returned, and a replica is provided as a replacement.
 The winner's gold medal (originally awarded in 1872 when the Claret Jug was not yet ready, and since awarded to all champions).
 If the winner is a professional, then the winner's share (18%) of the purse.
 Guaranteed entry to all future Open Championships until the age of 60, and entry to the next ten Opens, even if over the age of 60.
 Entry to the next five editions of the Masters Tournament, PGA Championship, and U.S. Open.
 Five year membership to the PGA Tour and the European Tour.
 Entry to the next edition of the WGC-HSBC Champions.
 Entry to the next five editions of The Players Championship, and the five invitational tournaments (Genesis Invitational, Fort Worth Invitational, the Arnold Palmer Invitational, the RBC Heritage, and the Memorial Tournament) on the PGA Tour.
Automatic invitations to three of the five senior majors once they turn 50; they receive a one-year invitation to the U.S. Senior Open and a lifetime invitation to the Senior PGA Championship and Senior Open Championship.
FedEx Cup, Race to Dubai, Ryder Cup/Presidents Cup, and Official World Golf Ranking points.

From 1860 to 1870, the winner received the challenge belt. When this was awarded to Young Tom Morris permanently for winning three consecutive tournaments, it was replaced by the gold medal (1872 onwards), and the claret jug (1873 onwards).

Other prizes and benefits, based upon finishing position

There are several benefits from being placed highly in the Open. These are:

 The runners up each receive a silver salver.
If the player is a professional, then a share of the purse. There is a distribution curve for those who make the cut, with 1st place getting 18%, 2nd 10.4%, 3rd 6.7%, 4th 5.2%, and 5th 4.2%. The percentage continues to fall by placing with 21st getting 1% and 37th 0.5%. Professionals who miss the cut received between US$7,375 and US$4,950.
 The top 10 players, including ties, get entry to the next edition of The Open Championship.
 The top 4 players, including ties, get entry to the next edition of the Masters Tournament.
FedEx Cup, Race to Dubai, Ryder Cup/Presidents Cup, and Official World Golf Ranking points.

Amateur medals

Since 1949 the leading amateur completing the final round receives a silver medal. Since 1972, any other amateur who competes in the final round receives a bronze medal. Amateurs do not receive prize money.

Professional Golfers' Association (of Great Britain and Ireland) awards
The Professional Golfers' Association (of Great Britain and Ireland) also mark the achievements of their own members in The Open.

 Ryle Memorial Medal – awarded since 1901 to the winner if he is a PGA member.
 Braid Taylor Memorial Medal – awarded since 1966 to the highest finishing PGA member.
 Tooting Bec Cup – awarded since 1924 to the PGA member who records the lowest single round during the championship.

The Braid Taylor Memorial Medal and the Tooting Bec Cup are restricted to members born in, or with a parent or parents born in, the United Kingdom or Republic of Ireland.

Courses

The Open Championship has always been held on a coastal links golf course in Scotland, England or Northern Ireland. The hosting pattern has been:
1860–1870: Prestwick Golf Club the sole host.
1872–1892: Three year rotation between Prestwick, St Andrews, and Musselburgh (replaced by Muirfield in 1892) golf clubs.
1893–1907: Five year rotation between Prestwick, Royal St George's, St Andrews, Muirfield, and Royal Liverpool Golf Clubs.
1908–1939: Six year rotation, initially between Prestwick, Royal Cinque Ports, St Andrews, Royal St George's, Muirfield, and Royal Liverpool Golf Clubs, so alternating between Scotland and England. A few changes were made to the rota of 6 courses after World War I.
1946–1972: Alternating between Scottish and English golf clubs continues, but without a fixed rota. Exceptions were St Andrews hosting pre- and post-World War II, and Northern Ireland hosting in 1951.
Since 1973: Usually three Scottish and two English courses hosting in a five-year period, mostly alternating between the two countries, with St Andrews hosting about every five years. Northern Ireland returned in 2019.

Overview
A total of 14 courses have hosted the Open, with ten currently active as part of the rotation, and four have been retired from the rotation (shown in italics). The year the golf course was originally built is shown in parenthesis.

Prestwick Golf Club (1851): Prestwick is The Open's original venue, and hosted 24 Opens in all, including the first 12. Old Tom Morris designed the original 12 hole course, but it was subsequently redesigned and expanded to be an 18-hole course in 1882. Serious overcrowding problems at Prestwick in 1925 meant that the course was never again used for the Open, and was replaced by Carnoustie Golf Links as the third Scottish course.

Old Course at St Andrews (1552): Considered the oldest golf course in the world, and referred to as "the home of golf". Famous features include the "Hell Bunker" (14th) and the Road Hole (17th). Due to its special status it usually hosts the open every five years in the modern era. It is designed to be played in wind, so can result in low scores in benign conditions.

Musselburgh Links (c1672): A 9-hole course that hosted six Opens as it was used by the Honourable Company of Edinburgh Golfers, one of the organisers of The Open between 1872 and 1920. When the Honourable Company built their own course in 1891 (Muirfield), it took over hosting duties. Musselburgh was unhappy with this and organised another rival 'Open' competition prior to the Muirfield event, one with greater prize money.

Muirfield (1891): Built by the Honourable Company of Edinburgh Golfers to replace Musselburgh on the rota. Known for the circular arrangement the course has, which means the wind direction on each hole changes, and can make it tricky to navigate. Briefly removed from the rota in 2016–17 due to not having any female members.

Royal St George's Golf Club (1887): Often simply referred to as Sandwich. The first venue to host in England, and the only venue on the current rota in Southern England. It went 32 years without hosting between 1949 and 1981, but returned following the rebuilding of three holes, tee changes to another two holes, and improved road links. Known for having the deepest bunker on the rota (4th hole).

Royal Liverpool Golf Club (1869): Often simply referred to as Hoylake. Royal Liverpool went 39 years without hosting between 1967 and 2006, but returned following changes to tees, bunkers, and greens. In 2006, Tiger Woods won by using his driver just once.

Royal Cinque Ports Golf Club (1892): Hosted the 1909 and 1920 Opens, and was scheduled to host in 1938 and 1949 but both had to be moved to Royal St George's Golf Club due to abnormally high tides flooding the course. It was removed from the rota but is still used for qualifying.

Royal Troon Golf Club (1878): First used in 1923 instead of Muirfield when "some doubts exists as to the Honourable Company of Edinburgh Golfers being desirous of their course being used for the event". Redesigned, lengthened, and strengthened by James Braid shortly before it held its first Open. Famous features include the "Postage Stamp" 8th hole, and the 601 yards 6th.

Royal Lytham & St Annes Golf Club (1886): A relatively short course, but has 167 bunkers which demand accuracy. Slightly inland as some coastal homes have been built since the course first opened.

Carnoustie Golf Links (1835): Replaced Prestwick after it was no longer suitable for the Open. It went through modifications prior to the 1999 Open. Thought of as being the toughest of the Open venues, especially the last three holes, and is well remembered for Jean van de Velde triple bogeying on the 18th when he only needed a double bogey to win. 

Prince's Golf Club (1906): Only hosted once in 1932. Has been redesigned in 1950 due to war damage.

Royal Portrush Golf Club (1888): The only venue to host the Open outside England and Scotland when it hosted in 1951. With the Troubles in Northern Ireland significantly diminished since the 1998 Good Friday Agreement, and after the successful hosting of the Irish Open it returned as host in 2019. The course underwent significant changes before the 2019 Open, including replacing the 17th and 18th holes, which also provided the space for spectators and corporate hospitality that a modern major requires.

Royal Birkdale Golf Club (1894): Extensively redesigned by Fred Hawtree and JH Taylor to create the current layout in 1922, it is known for its sand dunes towering the fairways. Often ranked as England's best Open venue.

Turnberry (1906): Made its Open debut in 1977, when Tom Watson and Jack Nicklaus famously played the Duel in the Sun. Known to be one of the most picturesque Open venues, it was bought by Donald Trump in 2014, who has spent substantial amounts renovating the course. On 11 January 2021, in the aftermath of the 2021 United States Capitol attack the week prior, the R&A announced that it will not stage a championship at Turnberry "in the foreseeable future".

Hosting record of each course

References:

Future venues

Records
Oldest winner: Old Tom Morris, 1867.
Youngest winner: Young Tom Morris, 1868.
Most victories: 6, Harry Vardon (1896, 1898, 1899, 1903, 1911, 1914).
Most consecutive victories: 4, Young Tom Morris (1868, 1869, 1870, 1872 – there was no championship in 1871).
Lowest score after 36 holes: 129, Louis Oosthuizen (64-65), 2021
Lowest score after 54 holes: 197, Shane Lowry (67-67-63), 2019
Lowest final score (72 holes): 264, Henrik Stenson (68-65-68-63), 2016.
Lowest final score (72 holes) in relation to par: −20, Henrik Stenson (68-65-68-63=264), 2016; Cameron Smith (67-64-73-64=268), 2022
Greatest victory margin: 13 strokes, Old Tom Morris, 1862. This remained a record for all majors until 2000, when Woods won the U.S. Open by 15 strokes at Pebble Beach. Old Tom's 13-stroke margin was achieved over 36 holes.
Lowest round: 62, Branden Grace, 3rd round, 2017; a record for all majors.
Lowest round in relation to par: −9, Paul Broadhurst, 3rd round, 1990; Rory McIlroy, 1st round, 2010.
Wire-to-wire winners (after 72 holes with no ties after rounds): Ted Ray in 1912, Bobby Jones in 1927, Gene Sarazen in 1932, Henry Cotton in 1934, Tom Weiskopf in 1973, Tiger Woods in 2005, and Rory McIlroy in 2014.
Most runner-up finishes: 7, Jack Nicklaus (1964, 1967, 1968, 1972, 1976, 1977, 1979)

Winners

Nationalities assigned above match those used in the official Open records.
Source: The 148th Open 2019 Media Guide

Silver Medal winners
Since 1949, the silver medal is awarded to the leading amateur, provided that the player completes all 72 holes. In the earlier years wealthy individuals would often maintain their amateur status, and hence could win multiple times, such as Frank Stranahan who won it four times in the first five years (and was also the low amateur in 1947). In the modern era players often turn professional soon after winning the silver medal, and hence never have a chance for multiple wins. Tiger Woods and Rory McIlroy are the only silver medal winners who have gone on to win the Open.

 1949 –  Frank Stranahan
 1950 –  Frank Stranahan (2)
 1951 –  Frank Stranahan (3)
 1952 –  Jackie Jones
 1953 –  Frank Stranahan (4)
 1954 –  Peter Toogood
 1955 –  Joe Conrad
 1956 –  Joe Carr
 1957 –  Dickson Smith
 1958 –  Joe Carr (2)
 1959 –  Reid Jack
 1960 –  Guy Wolstenholme
 1961 –  Ronnie White
 1962 –  Charlie Green
 1963 – none
 1964 – none
 1965 –  Michael Burgess
 1966 –  Ronnie Shade
 1967 – none
 1968 –  Michael Bonallack
 1969 –  Peter Tupling
 1970 –  Steve Melnyk
 1971 –  Michael Bonallack (2)
 1972 – none
 1973 –  Danny Edwards
 1974 – none
 1975 – none
 1976 – none
 1977 – none
 1978 –  Peter McEvoy
 1979 –  Peter McEvoy (2)
 1980 –  Jay Sigel
 1981 –  Hal Sutton
 1982 –  Malcolm Lewis
 1983 – none
 1984 – none
 1985 –  José María Olazábal
 1986 – none
 1987 –  Paul Mayo
 1988 –  Paul Broadhurst
 1989 –  Russell Claydon
 1990 – none
 1991 –  Jim Payne
 1992 –  Daren Lee
 1993 –  Iain Pyman
 1994 –  Warren Bennett
 1995 –  Steve Webster
 1996 –  Tiger Woods
 1997 –  Barclay Howard
 1998 –  Justin Rose
 1999 – none
 2000 – none
 2001 –  David Dixon
 2002 – none
 2003 – none
 2004 –  Stuart Wilson
 2005 –  Lloyd Saltman
 2006 –  Marius Thorp
 2007 –  Rory McIlroy
 2008 –  Chris Wood
 2009 –  Matteo Manassero
 2010 –  Jin Jeong
 2011 –  Tom Lewis
 2012 – none
 2013 –  Matt Fitzpatrick
 2014 – none
 2015 –  Jordan Niebrugge
 2016 – none
 2017 –  Alfie Plant
 2018 –  Sam Locke
 2019 – none
 2020 – no tournament
 2021 –  Matti Schmid
 2022 –  Filippo Celli

Broadcasting

The distribution of The Open is provided by a partnership between R&A Productions, European Tour Productions (both run by IMG) and CTV Outside Broadcasting. The broadcasters with onsite production are Sky (UK), NBC (USA), BBC (UK), and TV Asahi (Japan).

Many non-British broadcasters referred to the Open as the "British" Open in their coverage until 2010, when The R&A introduced use of contractual terms in their media contracts, similar to the Masters, and now rights holders are obliged to refer to the tournament as "The Open". On 7 November 2018, the parent company of the U.S. rights holder, NBC, completed a takeover of the U.K. rights holder, Sky. This means the media rights in the two primary markets are owned by the same company, albeit produced separately by two different subsidiaries. There are over 170 cameras on site during the tournament, including cameras in the face of the Open's pot bunkers.

United Kingdom

Television rights history

Ref:

Current broadcast hours for live coverage

Ref:
The BBC first started to broadcast the Open in 1955, with Peter Alliss involved since 1961, and having the role of lead commentator since 1978. With the growth of pay television, and the increasing value of sporting rights, the BBC's golf portfolio began to reduce. The loss of the rights to the Scottish Open, and BMW PGA Championship in 2012 left the BBC's only golf coverage as the Open, and the final two days of the Masters (which it shared with Sky). With so little golf, the BBC was accused of neglecting investment in production and was criticised about its 'quality of coverage and innovation' compared to Sky, which held the rights to most golf events. The tournament is considered a Category B event under the Ofcom Code on Sports and Other Listed and Designated Events, which allows its rights to be held by a pay television broadcaster as long as sufficient secondary coverage is provided by a free-to-air broadcaster.

Many were hoping that a deal similar to the Masters would be reached, where Sky had coverage of all four days, and the BBC also provided live weekend coverage, but Sky were not keen on this and won the full rights in 2015. Some were angered about the demise of golf on terrestrial television, and the impact that could have on the interest in golf in the U.K., whilst others were pleased about the perceived improved coverage that Sky would give. Despite Peter Alliss promising on air that the BBC would cover the 2016 event, the BBC reached a deal for Sky to take the coverage. The BBC still covers the tournament, showing highlights from 8pm–10pm on tournament days and radio coverage on Radio 5 Live. The deal with Sky required the broadcaster to restrict its advertisement breaks to 4 minutes every hour, similar to the Masters. Sky also offers complete coverage online through NOW to non-subscribers, which is £7.99 for one day, or £12.99 for a weeks access.

United States

Television rights history

Ref:

Current broadcast hours for live coverage (East Coast)

Ref:
ABC began broadcasting the Open in 1962, with taped highlights on Wide World of Sports. In the pre-digital age the coverage had to be converted from the U.K.'s PAL colour encoding system, to the U.S.'s NTSC, which meant picture quality could be impacted, especially in the early years. The coverage expanded over the years, and as is common in America, there was a different early round rights holder, which was ESPN until 2003 when TNT took over. Co-owned ESPN became responsible for ABC's sports coverage in 2006; it won the rights to cover all four days of the championship in 2010, and concurrently moved coverage to its channels. The Open became the first golf major to be covered exclusively on pay television in America, as ESPN left only highlights for its partner broadcast network.

After losing the rights to the U.S. Open in 2015, NBC bid aggressively to win the rights to the Open, and become a broadcaster of a golf major again. NBC also had a track record of broadcasting European sporting events successfully in the morning U.S. time with the Premier League, Formula One, and "Breakfast at Wimbledon", and was able to place early round coverage on its subsidiary Golf Channel. NBC won the rights from 2017 to 2028. ESPN also sold them the rights for 2016.

The 2019 edition of the Open Championship had a total of 49 hours of coverage in the United States, with 29 hours being on Thursday and Friday, and 20 hours being on Saturday and Sunday; the Golf Channel cable network had a total of 34 hours of coverage, with 29 hours on Thursday and Friday, and 5 hours on Saturday and Sunday. The NBC broadcast network had a total of 15 hours of coverage on the weekend, with 8 hours Saturday, and 7 hours Sunday. The 49 total hours of coverage on Golf Channel and NBC is down 30 minutes from 2018; the difference is that NBC's Sunday coverage is down 30 minutes, from 7.5 hours in 2018, to 7 hours in 2019.

TheOpen.com 
The Open provides limited coverage for free on its website including highlights, featured groups, featured holes, and radio coverage. The Open's local rights holders usually provide these feeds as part of their broadcast package.

Rest of the world 
The Open produces a 'world feed' for use by international broadcasters if they require. The other large golf markets in a similar time zone as the U.K. are the rest of Europe (where Sky, the U.K. broadcast company often has a presence), and South Africa where it is covered by SuperSport.

Japan, South Korea, Australia, New Zealand and increasingly China are markets with high media interest in golf and the Open, but the time zone means the prime coverage is shown in the early hours of the morning. 

Ref:

Notes

References

External links

Coverage on European Tour's official site
Coverage on the PGA Tour's official site

 
Men's major golf championships
Golf tournaments in England
Golf tournaments in Northern Ireland
Golf tournaments in Scotland
July sporting events
1860 establishments in Scotland
Recurring sporting events established in 1860
National championships in the United Kingdom
Annual sporting events in the United Kingdom